Pleasant Stream is a  tributary of Lycoming Creek in Lycoming and Sullivan counties, Pennsylvania, in the United States.

See also
List of rivers of Pennsylvania

References

Rivers of Lycoming County, Pennsylvania
Rivers of Pennsylvania
Rivers of Sullivan County, Pennsylvania
Tributaries of the West Branch Susquehanna River